Yeshivat Hesder Nahariya (also known as Yeshivat Nahar Deiah, Yeshivat Hesder of Nahariya or Nahar Deiah Hesder Yeshiva in Nahariya) is located in the northernmost city in Israel (or Nahariyya), on the Mediterranean coast. A Hesder yeshiva is one with an arrangement that combines combine religious Torah study with service in the army and community service. The Yeshivat Hesder Nahriya was founded in 1995 after a rocket attack from the Hezbollah by the Chief Rabbi of Nahariya, Rabbi Yeshayahu Meitlis. It opened with 15 students, by 2010 had more than 100 students and has a program for overseas students.

Students routinely volunteer in the community, at the hospital and shelters, supporting residents of Nahariya and the surrounding area with food and clothing. In 2001 the yeshiva founded a Relief Center and by 2010 it had evolved into the community organization, Bet Neriya, operating many education programs and relief projects for the region.

Philosophy
The yeshiva is dedicated to bringing about social change through building a stronger community in Nahariya that people can be proud to live within. The students, who are excellently-trained combat soldiers, enhance the atmosphere with faith, national pride and high esteem bringing the passion of Torah Study to the center of civilization.

"The values that the yeshiva represents are integrated into the hearts of all the residents of Nahariya. Anyone who has the slightest perception of the city knows that there is a tremendous enterprise that gives off light, influencing the very essence of the city. It truly is a river flowing with knowledge. Grace, kindness, and care for the public." Rabbi Yisrael Meir Lau – Chief Rabbi of Tel Aviv and former Chief Rabbi of Israel.

In the news
Yeshivat Hesder Nahar Deiah was the only local NGO active during the Second Lebanon War. The relief efforts of the yeshivah during the Second Lebanon war were well noted throughout the Israeli Press (Jerusalem Post, Ynet, Maariv, Besheva, Etrog Magazine).

Recently, together with the families of Ehud Goldwasser (from Nahariya) and Eldad Regev (from Northern Haifa), the Yeshiva has commissioned a Torah scroll in their memories which will be completed on the second anniversary in July 2010. (an article appeared in the Jerusalem Post)

References

External links
 Yeshivat Hesder Nahar Deiah website 
 Bet Neriya website 
 Nahariya - Google Map

Orthodox yeshivas in Israel